is a mountain of modest height on the border of the
cities Minamibōsō and Kamogawa in Chiba 
It is one of the
mountains of the Mineoka Mountain District of the Bōsō Hill Range. The kanji for Mount Karasuba, 烏 and 場, mean 'crow' and 'place' respectively. The mountain became a popular hiking destination after the construction of a hiking trail in 1975. The trail features three viewing platforms that offer views of the Pacific Ocean, surrounding hills, and nearby cities.

Mount Karasuba is covered by a laurisilva forest, a type of laurel forest found in subtropical areas. It is home to many examples of the Japanese stone oak and the sudajii castanopsis, an evergreen beech tree. The area around the Odawara district of Minamibōsō is a base for floriculture, and there are many flower fields at the base of Mount Karasuba, even in winter.

Transportation 
The hiking trail that leads to Mount Karasuba is accessible from Wadaura Station in Minamibōsō via the JR East Uchibō Line, although the hike to the summit can take several hours.

References 

Karasuba